Caversham Airfield, also known as Middle Swan Airfield was an airfield constructed at Caversham, Western Australia during World War II as a parent aerodrome for use by the Royal Navy's Fleet Air Arm and the United States Navy.

The airfield had a triangle of three landing strips.

Middle Swan was the parent airfield with the following satellite airfields:

Beverley
Bindoon
Gingin North
Mooliabeenee

The United States Army Air Corps also utilised the airfield during World War II.

It was also a gliding club location after the war.

Motor racing circuit
The airfield was later utilised as a motor racing circuit, hosting its first event in 1946. In 1956 the Western Australia Sporting Car Club gained a lease for the property, which was then converted into a permanent circuit. It became Western Australia's premier motor racing venue, hosting the Australian Grand Prix in 1957 and 1962 and the Six Hour Le Mans endurance race from 1955 to 1968. Racing activities ceased when the airfield was re-activated as a military facility for radio communications, and Western Australian racing shifted to Wanneroo Raceway in 1969.

See also
 List of airports in Western Australia
 Aviation transport in Australia

Notes

References

Further reading
 Lance Muir, Richard Duckworth, N. Hyde, (1946?) Flight without power - the art in Australia [videorecording]1 videocassette (VHS) (12 min., 2 sec.) : si., col. with b&w sequences ; 1/2 in. PAL format [State Film Archives collection] Showing the activities of gliding clubs in the various Australian states. Shows local enthusiast, Ric New, and activities at the bases of operations at Lake Pinjar (Pinjar Soaring Club), West Subiaco (WA Flying Club) and Caversham (Perth Gliding Club) in 1941 and 1946. WA segment is appr. 3 mins.

Motorsport venues in Western Australia
World War II airfields in Australia
Defunct airports in Western Australia
Australian Grand Prix
Sports venues completed in 1946
Defunct motorsport venues in Australia